Canoeing was contested at the 2015 European Games between 14 and 16 June 2015.

No canoe slalom events were held in Baku. A total of fifteen medal events were held, three for men only in canoe, and 12 events in kayak across both genders, all on flat water.

Despite the sport being described in official literature as canoe sprint, in line with Olympic practice, a canoe marathon, a 5000-metre non-Olympic event, was included for each gender.

Qualification

Each National Olympic Committee (NOC) is restricted to one boat per event, a maximum of fifteen boats, and therefore a maximum of 26 qualified athletes. Azerbaijan, as host, is guaranteed entry of three athletes, in three boats; K1-1000 metres and C1-1000 metres for men, and the K1-500 metres for women.

The bulk of qualification (all places other than host and 'universality' places) will be awarded by virtue of performance in the 2014 European Canoe Sprint Championships. Places will be awarded to NOCs rather than individual athletes. Each event has a quota of places available as set out below:

In the event an athlete qualifies in two boats (e.g. K1-1000m and K2-1000m), he or she will be allowed to compete in both events, but will only take up the quota place in the larger boat; the unused quota place in the smaller boat will then be redistributed. Where a boat qualifies in two events of the same boat size but over two distances (e.g. 200m and 1000m in K2), that boat will be allowed to compete in both events, but will only take up the quota place in the longer event; the unused quota place in the shorter event will then be redistributed. In both cases this will allow for more boats to compete in a particular event than there are quota places.

Timetable

Medalists

Men

Notes
  Miklós Dudás of Hungary originally won the gold medal, but were later disqualified due to doping violations.

Women

Medal table

References

External links
Results book

 
Sports at the 2015 European Games
2015
European Games